Likati is a town in the Aketi Territory of Bas-Uélé Province in the north of the Democratic Republic of the Congo (DRC).

Location

Likati is on the N4 road from Buta to Bondo.
The Likati River, a tributary of the Rubi River flows in a southerly direction past the east of the town.

Health

Likati was the site of an outbreak of Ebola virus disease in 2017. According to the World Health Organization, it is situated in the remote, isolated and hard-to-reach northern part of DRC, with limited transport and communication networks.

Transport

Public transport 

The Vicicongo line built by the Société des Chemins de Fer Vicinaux du Congo from Aketi via Komba reached Likati from the west on January 1, 1927. 
The line running north from Likati to Bondo via Libogo was opened in September the same year. The last train ran probably 2001.

Air transport 

There is an airport with grass landing strip, owned by the Protestant Church. 
Following OpenStreetMap, there is also a helicopter landing field on the football field in front of the Church of the town of Likati.

Road traffic 
The RN4 crosses the town and district of Likati from north to south. West of Likati the RN4 crosses the Likati River over a bridge.

References

Sources

See also 
 2017 Democratic Republic of the Congo Ebola virus outbreak

Populated places in Bas-Uélé